The EB-eye, also known as EBI Search, is a search engine that provides uniform access to the biological data resources hosted at the European Bioinformatics Institute (EBI).

The EB-eye – the EBI search engine for biological data
The European Bioinformatics Institute is a non-profit academic organisation that forms part of the European Molecular Biology Laboratory (EMBL). 
The EBI is a centre for research and services in bioinformatics. The Institute manages databases of biological data including nucleotide sequences, protein sequences and macromolecular structures.

The mission of the EBI 
  To provide freely available data and bioinformatics services to the scientific community in ways that promote scientific progress. 
  To contribute to the advancement of biology through basic investigator-driven research in bioinformatics. 
  To provide advanced bioinformatics training to scientists at all levels, from PhD students to independent investigators. 
  To help disseminate cutting-edge technologies to industry.

What is the EB-eye ?
The EB-eye is a fast and efficient search engine that currently provides easy and uniform access to biological data resources hosted at the EBI.

The project was started in August 2006 and is developed on top of the Apache Lucene technology. It is a Java framework that provides extremely powerful indexing and search capabilities. 

The EB-eye presents the hits of a search in a very simple way and acts as a gateway to access biological entries and related information in dedicated portals. One of the key features of EB-eye is the capability to coherently display the relationships that exist between diverse databases allowing the user to navigate this network of cross-references.

The user can search globally across all EBI data resources through the "Global Search" box or even create more specific queries on targeted resources by using the EB-eye Query Builder.

EB-eye publicly exposes both a web and a Web services RESTful interface.

Access to the EB-eye 
 From the EBI web site
 From https://www.ebi.ac.uk/ebisearch
 From the RESTful Web services API

Global search 
The global search is available on the EBI web site. You can simply type some query terms into the text search box there and press the search button (or press Enter). The system then displays a summary page with a list of various data sets and the number of matches found in each of them.

Global search examples 
 Search for insulin receptor
 Search for p53
 Search for web production team
 Search for escherichia NOT coli 
 Search for C2H2 zinc finger family
 Search for DNA binding

Query builder
The query builder allows users to create and save complex queries on the available data to get specific search results. See the complex query examples section.

What can the user search for? 
Many resources at EBI are indexed within the search engine, but some are not.
The EB-eye can search only the information that gets indexed. This implies that other search engines operating on biological data might yield different results. As a rule of thumb, the EB-eye search engine index identifiers, names, descriptions, keywords and cross-references.

Complex query examples 
 Search for description:azurin
 Search for paired box protein BUT NOT fragment OR paxillin
 Search for description:(paired box protein) INTERPRO:(IPR001523) in UniProtKB
 Search for (bacterium OR organism) AND (unidentified OR uncultured) (environmental samples)
 Search for calcium oscillation (Calcium oscillation models)

It is also possible to search using cross-references.

Help and documentation for EB-eye 
Further information about how to use this search engine is available at the EB-eye help and documentation.

Programmatic access to the EB-eye 
The EB-eye is also programmatically accessible through Web services technologies using the EB-eye RESTful interface. The EB-eye RESTful WADL (Web Application Description Language) is publicly available. 
See also the main Web services pages at the EBI.

Other Lucene-based search engine in biology/bioinformatics 
Lucene has been around for a while now. Many bioinformatics centres have been experimenting with its use with biological data and databases. A pioneering development in this field is headed by Dr. Don Gilbert at Indiana University, called LuceGene, a part of the GMOD (Generic Software Components for Model Organisms Databases) initiative. Another example is the search engine in the UniProt web site which is also based on Lucene and adds features such as sorting large data sets, subqueries across data sets and group-by queries. Lucene is also used in QuALM a question answering system for Wikipedia.

References

External links 
 EB-eye search engine
 The Apache Lucene project web site
 UniProt  web site
 GMOD Generic Software Components for Model Organisms Databases

Bioinformatics organizations
Internet search engines
Science and technology in Cambridgeshire
South Cambridgeshire District